Tremé is a neighborhood in New Orleans, Louisiana. "Tremé" is often rendered as Treme, and the neighborhood is sometimes called by its more formal French name, Faubourg Tremé; it is listed in the New Orleans City Planning Districts as Tremé / Lafitte when including the Lafitte Projects.

Founded in the 1810s, it is one of the oldest neighborhoods in the city, and was initially the main neighborhood of its free people of color. Historically a racially mixed neighborhood, it remains an important center of the city's African-American and Créole culture, especially the modern brass band tradition. Some sources go so far as to call it the oldest Black neighborhood in the nation.

Originally known as "Back of Town", urban planners renamed the neighborhood "Faubourg Tremé" in an effort to revitalize the historic area. A subdistrict of the Mid-City District Area, its boundaries as defined by the New Orleans City Planning Commission are Esplanade Avenue to the east, North Rampart Street to the south, St. Louis Street to the west and North Broad Street to the north.

History

The Tremé neighborhood began as the Morand Plantation and two forts—St. Ferdinand and St. John. Near the end of the 18th century, Claude Tremé purchased the land from the original plantation owner. By 1794 the Carondelet Canal was built from the French Quarter to Bayou St. John, splitting the land. Developers began building subdivisions throughout the area to house a diverse population that included Caucasians and free persons of color.

Tremé abuts the north, or lake, side of the French Quarter, away from the Mississippi River—"back of town" as earlier generations of New Orleanians used to say. Its traditional borders were Rampart Street on the south, Canal Street on the west, Esplanade Avenue on the east, and Broad Street on the north. Claiborne Avenue is a primary thoroughfare through the neighborhood. At the end of the 19th century, the Storyville red-light district was carved out of the upper part of Tremé; in the 1940s this was torn down and made into a public housing project. This area is no longer considered part of the neighborhood. The "town square" of Tremé was Congo Square—originally known as "Place des Nègres"—where slaves gathered on Sundays to dance. This tradition flourished until the United States took control, and officials grew more anxious about unsupervised gatherings of slaves in the years before the Civil War.

The square was also an important place of business for slaves, enabling some to purchase their freedom from sales of crafts and goods there. For much of the rest of the 19th century, the square was an open-air market. "Creoles of color" brass and symphonic bands gave concerts, providing the foundation for a more improvisational style that would come to be known as "Jazz". At the end of the 19th century, the city officially renamed the square "Beauregard Square" after the French Créole Confederate General P.G.T. Beauregard, but the neighborhood people seldom used that name. Late in the 20th century, the city restored the traditional name of "Congo Square".

In the early 1960s, in an urban renewal project later considered a mistake by most analysts, a large portion of central Tremé was torn down. The land stood vacant for some time, then in the 1970s the city created Louis Armstrong Park in the area and named Congo Square within Armstrong Park. In 1994, the New Orleans Jazz National Historical Park was established here.

Musicians from Tremé include Alphonse Picou, Kermit Ruffins, Troy "Trombone Shorty" Andrews, Lucien Barbarin, and "The King of Treme" Shannon Powell.  Additionally, comedian Mark Normand grew up in the neighborhood. While predominantly African-American, the population has been mixed from the 19th century through to the 21st. Jazz musicians of European ancestry such as Henry Ragas and Louis Prima also lived in Tremé. Also, Joe's Cozy Corner in Tremé is often considered the birthplace of Rebirth Brass Band, one of the most notable current New Orleans bands. Alex Chilton, who led the rock groups Big Star and The Box Tops, lived in Tremé  from the early 1990s until his death in 2010.

During Hurricane Katrina, the Tremé neighborhood suffered minor to moderate flooding. In the portion of the neighborhood in from I-10, the water was generally not high enough to damage many of the old raised homes. The neighborhood demographics have changed in recent years due to gentrification and the proliferation of short-term rentals such as Airbnb.

African-American heritage sites
Located in Tremé, the New Orleans African American Museum is dedicated to protecting, preserving, and promoting through education the history, art, and communities of African Americans in New Orleans and the African diaspora. It is listed on the Louisiana African American Heritage Trail, as is the community's St. Augustine Church — the oldest African-American Catholic parish in the U.S.

Geography

Adjacent neighborhoods
 Bayou St. John (west)
 French Quarter (east)
 Iberville Projects (south)
 Seventh Ward (north)
 Tulane/Gravier (south)

Boundaries
The New Orleans City Planning Commission defines the boundaries of Tremé as these streets: Esplanade Avenue, North Rampart Street, St. Louis Street, North Broad Street.

Demographics
As of the census of 2000, there were 8,853 people, 3,429 households, and 2,064 families residing in the neighborhood. The population density was 12,830 /mi2 (4,918 /km2).

As of the census of 2010, there were 4,155 people residing in the neighborhood. The neighborhood was 92.4% Black or African American, 4.9% White, 1.5% Hispanic, 0.1% Asian, 0.5% Two or More Races, and 0.6% Other.

As of the census of 2020, there were 4,590 people residing in the neighborhood. The neighborhood is 56.3% Black or African American, 35.6% White, 5.1% Hispanic, 0.4% Asian, 2.6% Two or More Races, and 0.2% Other.

Education
New Orleans Public Schools and various charter schools serve the community.
Joseph S. Clark Preparatory High School is located in Tremé.
The McDonogh 35 High School is in the Tremé area. There were plans to move the school to the Phillips/Waters school site by 2013.

The Roman Catholic Archdiocese of New Orleans operates Catholic schools. St. Peter Claver School was in Tremé. It was established in 1921, and closed in 2019. In its final year it had 147 students, while the archdiocese's expected enrollment was 200. At the time its budget shortfall was $83,000. Its tuition usually ranged from $5,400 to $5,900 during the 2017-2018 school year.

In popular culture

Films
Shake the Devil Off (2007), a documentary co-written by Swiss-based director Peter Entell with Lydia Breen, that explores the post-Katrina lives of parishioners at St. Augustine Church in the Tremé (the oldest predominantly black Catholic parish in the nation). Father Jerome LeDoux (St. Augustine's priest 1990-2005) was a central character in the film. In 2006, he was recognized by the City of New Orleans for his work fostering greater appreciation of the Tremé's black history and culture.
Faubourg Treme: The Untold Story of Black New Orleans (2008), a documentary film by Dawn Logsdon and Lolis Eric Elie, former Times Picayune columnist and later HBO Tremé staff writer, which bridges the pre- and post-Katrina stories of Tremé (America’s oldest surviving black community and neighborhood) and features a cast of local musicians, artists and writers
Tradition is a Temple (2011), popular contemporary musicians from the Tremé, like "The King of Tremé" Shannon Powell, Lucien Barbarin, and the Treme Brass Band, are featured heavily in this non-fiction film by Darren Hoffman

Music
Jazz singer Dee Dee Bridgewater recorded her album Dee Dee's Feathers (2015) in Esplanade Studios in Tremé, to commemorate 10th anniversary of Hurricane Katrina.

Television
 Treme, an HBO drama series created in 2010 by David Simon (creator of The Wire) and Eric Overmeyer, is set in the aftermath of Hurricane Katrina and centers on the lives of residents of the Tremé area.

Gallery

See also
 Lafitte Projects
 Neighborhoods in New Orleans

References

External links

 Downtown Neighborhoods Improvement Association at dnianola.org Neighborhood Associations Representing Treme

 
Downtown New Orleans
Neighborhoods in New Orleans